The DS-22 is a Canadian trailerable sailboat, that was designed by Bruce Kirby and first built in 1983.

The DS-22 is a development of the 1976 Vision 660.

Production
The boat was built by Diller-Schwill in Odessa, Ontario, Canada, but it is now out of production.

Design
The DS-22 is a small recreational keelboat, built predominantly of fiberglass, with wood trim. It has a masthead sloop rig, a transom-hung rudder and a fixed keel with a centreboard. It displaces  and carries  of ballast.

The boat is normally fitted with a small outboard motor for docking and maneuvering.

The boat has a PHRF racing average handicap of 255 with a high of 252 and low of 258.

Operational history
In a review Michael McGoldrick wrote, "The DS 22 is good looking boat with a swing keel and sensible cabin layout. Some of these boat were built with a main hatch which lifted to provide over 6 feet (1.9m) of headroom in the cabin."

See also
List of sailing boat types

Related development
DS-16

Similar sailboats
Alberg 22
Cape Dory 22
Capri 22
Catalina 22
CS 22
Edel 665
Falmouth Cutter 22
Hunter 22
J/22
Marlow-Hunter 22
Marshall 22
Nonsuch 22
Pearson Electra
Pearson Ensign
Santana 22
Seaward 22
Spindrift 22
Starwind 223
Tanzer 22
US Yachts US 22

References

External links

Keelboats
1980s sailboat type designs
Sailing yachts
Trailer sailers
Sailboat type designs by Bruce Kirby
Sailboat types built by DS Yachts